Minions: The Rise of Gru (also known as Minions 2) is a 2022 American computer-animated comedy film produced by Illumination and distributed by Universal Pictures. It is the sequel to the spin-off prequel Minions (2015) and the fifth entry overall in the Despicable Me franchise. The film was directed by Kyle Balda, co-directed by Brad Ableson and Jonathan del Val, and produced by Chris Meledandri, Janet Healy and Chris Renaud, from a screenplay written by Matthew Fogel, and a story by Fogel and Brian Lynch. The film features Steve Carell reprising his role as Gru and Pierre Coffin as the Minions, with Taraji P. Henson, Michelle Yeoh, Russell Brand, Julie Andrews, and Alan Arkin in supporting roles. In the film, an eleven-year-old Gru plans to become a supervillain with the help of his Minions, which leads to a showdown with a malevolent team, the Vicious 6.

After being delayed for two years due to the COVID-19 pandemic, Minions: The Rise of Gru had its world premiere at the Annecy International Animation Film Festival on June 13, 2022, and was theatrically released in the United States on July 1, by Universal Pictures. The film received generally positive reviews from critics; some deemed it an improvement over its predecessor, with praise earned for its soundtrack, animation, humor, voice performances (particularly Carell's), and aesthetic, although its plot was criticized. Minions: The Rise of Gru was a box office success, grossing over $939 million worldwide and making it the fifth-highest-grossing film of 2022.

Plot

In 1976, an eleven-year-old Gru dreams of becoming a supervillain, assisted by the Minions, whom he has hired to work for him. Gru is ecstatic when he receives an audition invitation from the Vicious 6, a supervillain team now led by Belle Bottom, who hope to find a new member to replace their founder, the supervillain Wild Knuckles, following their betrayal and attempted murder of Knuckles during a heist to steal the Zodiac Stone – a stone connected to the Chinese zodiac. Gru's interview goes poorly but, much to the outrage of the Vicious 6, he steals the stone and escapes with Minions Kevin, Stuart, and Bob, handing it to another Minion, Otto, for safekeeping.

At his basement lair, Gru is outraged that Otto has traded the zodiac stone for a pet rock, causing him to fire the Minions before going alone to find it. However, Knuckles kidnaps Gru before taking him to San Francisco and informs the Minions that if they do not give him the stone within 48 hours, Gru will be killed. Failing to locate the stone, Kevin, Stuart and Bob leave for San Francisco to rescue Gru, while Otto leaves in pursuit of a biker whom he realizes has the stone as a necklace. When they reach Knuckles' house, they are chased by his goons until Master Chow, a former Kung Fu teacher who now makes a living at an acupuncture clinic, rescues them by defeating the goons.

Chow teaches the Minions Kung Fu after they beg and, ending their training prematurely, go to Knuckles' home to rescue Gru. Meanwhile, Otto catches up to and befriends the biker at Death Valley, who gives the stone back and takes him to San Francisco. Gru begins to bond with Knuckles after the latter's goons quit on him, and later saves him from being eaten by crocodiles in his pool. Teaching Gru how to be a villain, the two rob the Bank of Evil. In the meantime, the Vicious 6, having realized that Knuckles is alive, destroy his house in an attempt to find him. Failing to do so, they head towards Chinatown, with Kevin, Stuart and Bob in pursuit.

Returning to his destroyed house, a distraught Knuckles laments his friends' betrayal and decides to give up villainy, sending Gru away. During a Chinese New Year parade in Chinatown, Otto and Gru find each other with the stone but are cornered by the Vicious 6, who in turn are confronted by Anti-Villain League agents. The Vicious 6 then use the stone to turn themselves into large superpowered versions of animals from the Zodiac and prepare to kill Gru by tying him to the hands of a clock tower to rip him apart. Kevin, Stuart, and Bob find Gru, but are turned into a rabbit, a rooster, and a goat, respectively. However, Knuckles returns and fights the Vicious 6 with the Minions. Encouraged by Chow's teaching, Kevin, Stuart, and Bob "find their inner beast" and battle the Vicious 6 while Otto saves Gru, but Knuckles gets badly burnt by Belle's dragon flames when trying to take the stone back. After Kevin, Stuart and Bob knock the Vicious 6 out, Gru uses the stone to turn them into rats. Congratulating the three Minions for saving his life, Gru reconciles and rehires the Minions and returns Stuart, Kevin and Bob back to normal.

The Vicious 6 are arrested, including Knuckles, who is hospitalized and seemingly succumbs to his injuries, while the stone is confiscated by the Anti-Villain League. At Knuckles' funeral, Gru gives a heartfelt eulogy but is overjoyed when it is revealed Knuckles faked his death. He and Gru later drive off with the Minions.

In a mid-credits scene, Gru attempts to hire Dr. Nefario in gratitude for an invention of his that helped him steal the stone. Nefario initially declines but changes his mind after Gru and the Minions beg, giving them a ride on a rocket-powered aircraft.

Voice cast
 Steve Carell as Gru, a rising supervillain and the boss of the Minions
 Pierre Coffin as Kevin, Stuart, Bob, Otto and the rest of the Minions, Gru's yellow troublesome newly-hired henchmen
 Alan Arkin as Wild Knuckles, the former leader of the Vicious 6 who later becomes Gru's mentor
 Taraji P. Henson as Belle Bottom, a master thief and the newly-appointed leader of the Vicious 6
 Michelle Yeoh as Master Chow, an acupuncturist and Kung Fu fighter who helps the Minions on their quest
 Julie Andrews as Marlena Gru, Gru's mother
 Russell Brand as Dr. Nefario, a scientist who runs a record store
 Jean-Claude Van Damme as Jean-Clawed, a member of the Vicious 6 with a giant mechanical lobster claw for his right arm
 Dolph Lundgren as Svengeance, a member of the Vicious 6 who is a roller skater
 Danny Trejo as Stronghold, a member of the Vicious 6 with big metal hands
 Lucy Lawless as Nun-chuck, a member of the Vicious 6 who is a nun and wields nunchaku

Additionally, Will Arnett and Steve Coogan reprise their respective voice roles as Mr. Perkins and Silas Ramsbottom, both of whom become directors of the Bank of Evil and the Anti-Villain League in the main Despicable Me films. Michael Beattie voices both as the VNC announcer and Guru Rick. Jimmy O. Yang, Kevin Michael Richardson and John DiMaggio voice three of Wild Knuckles' goons. RZA voices the biker who Otto befriends on his way to San Francisco. Raymond S. Persi voices Brad.

Production
In January 2017, Universal Pictures and Illumination announced the sequel to their animated film, Minions. The film began production in July 2017, with Brad Ableson added as a co-director. In May 2019, the film's title was revealed as Minions: The Rise of Gru. In December 2019, it was announced that Pierre Coffin and Steve Carell would be reprising their roles as the Minions and Gru, respectively. Carell was paid $12.5 million for his involvement. Production of the film shifted to remote work during the COVID-19 pandemic, following the temporary closure of Illumination Studios Paris. To incorporate 1970s culture and environment in the film, Wade Eastwood and Ric Meyers were hired as creative consultants while Flora Zhao joined in as a cultural consultant on Chinese culture. The film was officially completed on July 1, 2020.

The film was dedicated in memory of animator Madeline Montero, who died during production of the film.

Music

The soundtrack album for the film was released on July 1, 2022, through Decca Records and Verve Label Group. The Jack Antonoff-produced soundtrack consists of various contemporary artists covering famous funk, pop, and soul hits of the 1970s. "Turn Up the Sunshine" by Diana Ross and Tame Impala was released as the album's lead single on May 20, 2022. It was followed by Kali Uchis's cover of "Desafinado" and St. Vincent's cover of "Funkytown".

On July 8, 2022, a score from longtime Illumination composer Heitor Pereira was released with two versions of "Bad Moon Rising" and "You Can't Always Get What You Want" being performed by Steve Carell and Pierre Coffin, both songs that were not in the original soundtrack. A new version of the "Despicable Me" theme song, by Pereira and Pharrell Williams, featuring a chorus of children was used in the film but not included in the score or the soundtrack.

Release

Theatrical
Minions: The Rise of Gru debuted at the Annecy International Animated Film Festival on June 13, 2022, followed by a premiere on June 25, at the TCL Chinese Theatre in Los Angeles. The film was originally scheduled for general release on July 3, 2020, but due to the COVID-19 pandemic and the film's incomplete status with Illumination Mac Guff temporary closure in response to that event, it was pushed back to July 2, 2021, and later to July 1, 2022.

The film was rumored to have been banned in Lebanon. While the reason for the ban has not been specified, users on social media speculate it was because of the character Nun-chuck portrays nuns as evil.

The theatrical Chinese release of the film replaced the ending scene with a message stating that Wild Knuckles was arrested and sentenced to twenty years in prison, pursued his love of acting and started his own theater troupe, while Gru "returned to his family".

Marketing
Deadline Hollywood reported Universal spent $285 million on promotion and tie-ins for the film, the biggest-ever campaign for a Despicable Me film. Toy company Mattel announced that it had entered a three-year deal to create merchandise based on the film. Lego released two sets for the film in 2020. A collaboration with Minecraft, featuring content from the film as well as content from the overall franchise, was released in 2021. Similarly, a collaboration with the film was made within the Roblox game Adopt Me! IHOP created a special menu based on the film.

Home media
Universal Pictures Home Entertainment released Minions: The Rise of Gru for digital download on August 2, 2022, and on 4K Ultra HD, Blu-ray, and DVD on September 6. The film was made available to stream on NBCUniversal's Peacock streaming service on September 23, 2022, and will stream for four months as part of an 18-month deal. It would then move to Netflix for ten months, before returning to Peacock for the last four.

Reception

Box office
Minions: The Rise of Gru grossed $369.7 million in the United States and Canada, and $570.8 million in other territories, for a worldwide total of $940.5 million. It is the fifth-highest-grossing film of 2022.

In the United States and Canada, Minions: The Rise of Gru was initially projected to gross $70–80 million from 4,391 theaters over its four-day opening weekend. After making $48.2 million on its first day (including an estimated $10.8 million from Thursday previews), the best for an animated film among the pandemic and of the Despicable Me franchise, estimates were raised to $129 million. It went on to debut to $107 million (and a four-day total of $123.1 million), topping the box office. Its total set the Independence Day weekend record, surpassing Transformers: Dark of the Moons $115.9 million in 2011. The film made $46.1 million in its second weekend (a drop of 57%), finishing second behind newcomer Thor: Love and Thunder. Minions: The Rise of Gru is the sixth highest-grossing film of 2022 in this region.

The film opened in Australia a week before its U.S. release, debuting at $3.7 million. It added another 60 international markets in its sophomore weekend and made $87.2 million. The combined first and second offshore weekends were 13% below Minions (2015) and 3% below Despicable Me 3 (2017). Four countries—Argentina, Saudi Arabia, Israel, and Venezuela—had the biggest animation opening weekend of all time. The popular TikTok trend that accompanied its release (see below) was credited for Israel's record-breaking performance. In its third international weekend, Minions: The Rise of Gru passed the $400 million worldwide mark after adding $56.4 million to its total. In France, it set records for the biggest Illumination animation opening day of all time, the third biggest animation opening day of all time, and the biggest opening (including previews) of 2022. The film passed the $500 million worldwide mark in its fourth weekend, $600 million worldwide by its fifth. and $700 million worldwide by its sixth.

Critical response
  Audiences polled by CinemaScore gave the film an average grade of "A" on an A+ to F scale, the same grade as its predecessor, while PostTrak gave the film an 87% overall positive score, with 71% saying they would definitely recommend it.

Johnny Oleksinski from The New York Post rated the film three out of four stars, stating that "while a tad too light, as these films often are, nobody is making animated characters as funny or likable (or marketable) as the Minions." Serena Puang from Boston Globe gave the film two and a half stars out of four and wrote: "The movie is fun: The music is unironically good -- a particular standout is the Minions's rendition of Simon and Garfunkel's 'Cecilia'; Bob, as cute as ever, learns that 'even the smallest of us are capable of great things'." Scroll.in Udita Jhunjhunwala, giving a positive review, wrote: "The animated comedy is an 88-minute delight, further enlivened by the talented voice cast..."

Peter Bradshaw from The Guardian rated the film two stars out of five, writing that "the plot is perfunctory and it runs on the faintest of fumes." Bilge Ebiri from Vulture gave the film a negative review, writing that "it looks nice, the kids will enjoy it, and, at 87 minutes, it all goes down relatively smoothly — but it's not quite smart enough to be as stupid as it wants to be."

#Gentleminions TikTok trend
A popular Internet meme involving groups of young adults dressed in suits like the character Gru attending the film and some dressing up like Minions with the tag #Gentleminions began spreading on TikTok almost immediately after the film's release. The meme originated with a group of Australian high schoolers. It is usually accompanied by American rapper Yeat's song "Rich Minion", which was commissioned for the Cole Bennett-directed trailer of the film. Large groups recorded themselves cheering, throwing bananas at the screen, and performing Gru's trademark steepled fingers gesture. Several theaters in the United Kingdom banned groups of young men in formal attire from seeing the film due to their disruptive behavior during screenings. The meme was also documented in the United States, Norway, Singapore, and Israel.

The substantial meme subculture around The Rise of Gru was noted by The Face to be similar to memes surrounding the superhero film Morbius, released earlier in 2022. Both meme subcultures focused around a largely ironic appreciation for the supposed strengths of said film, often verging on the absurdist, but The Face noted that the interest in The Rise of Gru was largely based in genuine interest in the film, whereas the interest in Morbius was based solely in the latter's perceived lack of quality.

The social media accounts for Universal Pictures, Illumination, and the franchise acknowledged the meme, with the latter two posting a video that depicted the Minions participating in the trend.

PostTrak reported that 34% of The Rise of Gru audiences were between the ages of 13 and 17, an unusually high percentage for an animated film. Pamela McClintock of The Hollywood Reporter concluded that the results of the survey were a result of the Internet trend.

Accolades

References

External links

2020s American animated films
2020s children's animated films
2020s English-language films
2022 3D films
2022 action comedy films
2022 computer-animated films
American children's animated adventure films
American children's animated comedy films
American computer-animated films
Animated films about revenge
Films set in 1976
Animated films set in San Francisco
Despicable Me
Film and television memes
Film censorship in China
Film spin-offs
Films impacted by the COVID-19 pandemic
Films postponed due to the COVID-19 pandemic
Films produced by Chris Meledandri
Films produced by Janet Healy
Films scored by Heitor Pereira
Illumination (company) animated films
IMAX films
Internet memes introduced in 2022
Interquel films
Universal Pictures animated films